Glenn Grief (born 15 August 1973) is an Australian former professional rugby league footballer who played in the 1990s and 2000s. A City New South Wales representative forward, he played in the NRL for the Western Suburbs Magpies, Newcastle Knights and South Sydney Rabbitohs.

Background
Grief was born in Fairfield, New South Wales

Playing career
Grief made his debut for Western Suburbs in round 7 of the 1993 season against Manly-Warringah at Campbelltown Stadium.

Grief played most of his career with the Newcastle Knights  . He played for Newcastle from the interchange bench in their upset 2001 NRL grand final victory over Parramatta.  The following year, he joined South Sydney and played in their first game back after re-admission which was a 40–6 loss against arch-rivals the Sydney Roosters.  This would be Grief's final game in the top grade.

References

1973 births
Living people
Australian rugby league players
Newcastle Knights players
South Sydney Rabbitohs players
New South Wales City Origin rugby league team players
Rugby league players from Sydney
Rugby league props
Western Suburbs Magpies players